Vilada is a municipality in the comarca of Berguedà, Catalonia, of about 500 residents. Its name is documented in the 9th century as Villalata, translated as "ample town".

Demonym
Vilada has no demonym. While the appropriate name in Catalan would be Viladí or Viladina, this can cause confusion with residents of a neighborhood of the comarca's capital, Berga, named "Viladins". Therefore, residents are simply de Vilada.

Places of interest

 Parish church of Saint John the Baptist.
 Church of Santa Magdalena de Gardilans.
 Ruins of the Castell de Roset.
 Church of Sant Miquel de les Canals.

References

External links
Town Website
 Government data pages 

Municipalities in Berguedà